Amara  fulva is a species of ground beetle native to Europe.

References

Further reading
 

fulva
Beetles described in 1776
Beetles of Europe
Taxa named by Otto Friedrich Müller